Middelgrunden may refer to:

 Middelgrunden (Øresund), a shoal in the Øresund, Denmark
 Middelgrunden wind farm, an offshore wind park on the shoal Middelgrunden
 Middelgrundsfortet, a fort on the shoal Middelgrunden